Tong Tau Po Tsuen is a village in the Shap Pat Heung area of Yuen Long District, Hong Kong.

Administration
Tong Tau Po Tsuen is a recognized village under the New Territories Small House Policy. It is one of the villages represented within the Shap Pat Heung Rural Committee. For electoral purposes, Tong Tau Po Tsuen is part of the Shap Pat Heung East constituency, which was formerly represented by Lee Chun-wai until July 2021.

History
At the time of the 1911 census, the population of Tong Tau Po was 116. The number of males was 53.

References

External links
 Delineation of area of existing village Tong Tau Po (Shap Pat Heung) for election of resident representative (2019 to 2022)

Villages in Yuen Long District, Hong Kong
Shap Pat Heung